The French Senior Open (or Open de France Senior) is a senior (over 50s) men's professional golf tournament on the European Senior Tour. In 1994 and 2004 it was played at Golf d'Omaha Beach, Port-en-Bessin, Normandy, in 1998 and 1999 it was played at Pau Golf Club, Pau, Pyrénées-Atlantiques, in 2000 it was played at Golf de Joyenval, Chambourcy near Paris and in 2007 at Golf de Divonne-les-Bains in Divonne-les-Bains, ten miles north of Geneva. The prize fund was €200,000 in 2004 and €325,000 in 2007.

After a long hiatus the event returned to the tour schedule as the Legends Open de France in 2021, played at Golf de Saint-Cloud in Paris and hosted by Jean van de Velde.

Winners

References

European Senior Tour events
Golf tournaments in France
Recurring sporting events established in 1994
1994 establishments in France